Notre Dame Roman Catholic Girls' School is an all-girls' Roman Catholic secondary school (having been a grammar school until 1977) situated in Elephant and Castle, in south London in the UK. Girls attend the school from ages 11–16 (11-18 until the 1980s). The current headteacher is Anne Marie Niblock.

School history
Previous Headteachers include Sister Myra Poole, SND and Sister Rosemary O'Callaghan, SND. Sister Rosemary O' Callaghan is now acting as the school chaplain.

The school was founded by the Sisters of Notre Dame de Namur in 1855 and celebrated its 150th anniversary in the London Borough of Southwark.

The school converted to academy status in December 2022, and previously was a voluntary aided school administered by the Southwark London Borough Council. The school is sponsored by the Roman Catholic Archdiocese of Southwark and the South East London Catholic Academy Trust but coordinates with the local authority for admissions.

Linked schools
The Sisters of Notre Dame de Namur base their spirituality on the teachings of their Mother Foundress, Saint Julie Billiart. The Sisters of Notre Dame de Namur founded other schools in the United Kingdom:
 Notre Dame High School, Glasgow
 Notre Dame Catholic Sixth Form College, Leeds
 Notre Dame High School, Norwich
 Notre Dame Catholic School, Plymouth
 Notre Dame High School, Sheffield
 Notre Dame Catholic College, Liverpool
 several schools which became part of St Julie's Catholic High School, Liverpool

They also previously had schools in Battersea, London;  Wigan, Lancashire; and a boarding school in Birkdale, Lancashire (some of the other schools having initially been boarding and day schools).

School performance
As of 2020, the school was last inspected by Ofsted in 2012, when it received a judgement of Outstanding.

In 2019 the school was identified as the most undersubscribed school of those judged Outstanding; it had the lowest ratio of applications per place.

References

External links
Notre Dame Roman Catholic Girls' School official website

Educational institutions established in 1855
Secondary schools in the London Borough of Southwark
Girls' schools in London
Catholic secondary schools in the Archdiocese of Southwark
Sisters of Notre Dame de Namur schools
1855 establishments in England
Academies in the London Borough of Southwark